Billboard Top R&B Records of 1954 is made up of two year-end charts compiled by Billboard magazine ranking the year's top rhythm and blues records based on record sales and juke box plays.

See also
List of Billboard number-one R&B songs of 1954
Billboard year-end top 30 singles of 1954
1954 in music

References

United States RandB Year-end
Billboard charts
1954 in American music